Janchivlin is a settlement and mineral springs resort in the Erdene sum of Töv Province in Mongolia, with a Sanatorium built in socialist times. It is located 20 km south-west from the Erdene sum center. Ar Janchivlin Resort is 12 km north-west from Janchivlin.

References 
 Country Information  -  Consulate of Mongolia in Hong Kong

Populated places in Mongolia